The Angami Women Organization, formerly known as Angamimiapfü Mechü Krotho, is an Indian public organization. It is the apex women organization of the Angami Nagas.

History 
Founded as Angamimiapfü Mechü Krotho, the organization was renamed as Angami Women Organization in 2022.

In 2023, former President of the Angami Women Organization, Salhoutuonuo Kruse, became the first woman from Nagaland to be elected to the Nagaland Legislative Assembly.

References 

Ethnic organisations based in India
Naga people
Kohima